"(The System of) Dr. Tarr and Professor Fether" is a 1976 single by The Alan Parsons Project which first appeared on their album Tales of Mystery and Imagination: Edgar Allan Poe. The single reached number 37 on the US Billboard Hot 100 and number 62 in Canada. Like the other songs on the album, it is based on a story by American author Edgar Allan Poe, in this case "The System of Doctor Tarr and Professor Fether" (1845); the song was written by Alan Parsons and Eric Woolfson, and was originally recorded at Abbey Road Studios, London in September 1975. The 1987 reissue featured a "cathedral organ".

Personnel 
Ian Bairnson — guitars
Jack Harris — backing vocals
Billy Lyall — piano
John Miles — lead vocals, guitars
David Paton — bass guitar
Alan Parsons — cathedral organ (1987 reissue version), recorders
Stuart Tosh — drums, percussion
Eric Woolfson — keyboards
Abbey Road Effects Library — crowd noises

References

External links
 discogs

1976 singles
Music based on works by Edgar Allan Poe
The Alan Parsons Project songs
Songs written by Alan Parsons
Songs written by Eric Woolfson
20th Century Fox Records singles
Charisma Records singles
Song recordings produced by Alan Parsons
1976 songs
Songs about fictional male characters
Music based on short fiction